St. Jude's Public School & Junior College is a residential public school located in the city of Kotagiri in the Nilgiris district of the Indian state of Tamil Nadu. It follows the Indian Certificate of Secondary Education (ICSE) and Indian School Certificate (ISC) examinations conducted by the Council for the Indian School Certificate Examinations.  The school was founded in 1979 by P. P. Dhanarajan.

References

Official Website

Boarding schools in Tamil Nadu
Primary schools in Tamil Nadu
High schools and secondary schools in Tamil Nadu
Schools in Nilgiris district
Educational institutions established in 1979
1979 establishments in Tamil Nadu